Farid Abdel Zato-Arouna (born 23 April 1992) is a Togolese footballer who plays for Icelandic club Kórdrengir, as a midfielder.

Career
Zato-Arouna has played for FH, HK, Víkingur Ólafsvík, KR, Kári, Keflavík and Sigma Olomouc B.

He made his international debut for Togo in 2013.

References

1992 births
Living people
Togolese footballers
Togo international footballers
Fimleikafélag Hafnarfjarðar players
Handknattleiksfélag Kópavogs players
Ungmennafélagið Víkingur players
Knattspyrnufélag Reykjavíkur players
Knattspyrnudeild Keflavík players
SK Sigma Olomouc players
Úrvalsdeild karla (football) players
1. deild karla players
2. deild karla players
3. deild karla players
Czech National Football League players
Association football midfielders
Togolese expatriate footballers
Togolese expatriate sportspeople in Iceland
Expatriate footballers in Iceland
Togolese expatriate sportspeople in the Czech Republic
Expatriate footballers in the Czech Republic
Kórdrengir players
21st-century Togolese people